This is a list of notable ice cream parlor chains. Ice cream parlors are places that sell ice cream, gelato, sorbet and/or frozen yogurt to consumers. Ice cream is typically sold as regular ice cream (also called hard-packed ice cream), gelato and soft serve, which is typically dispensed by a machine with a limited number of flavors (e.g. chocolate, vanilla, and a mix of the two). It is customary for ice cream parlors to offer several ice cream flavors and items.

Ice cream parlor chains

 Amorino
 Abbott's Frozen Custard
 Amy's Ice Creams
 Andy's Frozen Custard
 Angelo Brocato's
 Australian Homemade
 Bakdash
 Baskin-Robbins
 Beacon Drive In 
 Ben & Jerry's
 Berthillon
 Big Gay Ice Cream
 Blue Bell Creameries
 Braum's
 Brigham's Ice Cream
 Brooklyn Ice Cream Factory
 Bruster's Ice Cream
 Cadwalader's Ice Cream
 Carl's Ice Cream
 Carvel
 Ciao Bella Gelato Company
 Cold Rock Ice Creamery
 Cold Stone Creamery
 Coolhaus 
 Coppelia
 Cows Creamery
 Culver's
 Dairy Queen
 Emack & Bolio's
 Fentons Creamery
 Fosters Freeze
 Four Seas Ice Cream
 Freddy's Frozen Custard & Steakburgers
 Friendly's
 G&D's
 Giolitti
 Good Times Burgers & Frozen Custard
 Graeter's
 Grido Helado
 Häagen-Dazs
 Handel's Homemade Ice Cream & Yogurt
 Happy Joe's
 Herrell's Ice Cream
 High's Dairy Store
 Island Creamery
 Jeni's Splendid Ice Creams
 KaleidoScoops
 Kaspa's
 Kopp's Frozen Custard
 Kawartha Dairy Company
 Lappert's
 Lares Ice Cream Parlor
 Laura Secord Chocolates
 Llaollao
 MADO
 MaggieMoo's Ice Cream and Treatery
 Marble Slab Creamery
 Margie's Candies
 Mauds Ice Creams
 Max and Mina's
 Meadows Frozen Custard
 Menchie's Frozen Yogurt
 Movenpick
 Natural Ice Cream
 New Zealand Natural
 Newport Creamery
 Oberweis Dairy
 Paletería La Michoacana
 Penn State University Creamery
 Rita's Italian Ice
 Salt & Straw
 Sanders Confectionery
 Sarris Candies
 Shake Shack
 Shake's Frozen Custard
 Sonic Drive-In
 Sprinkles Ice Cream
 Steve's Ice Cream
 Strickland's Frozen Custard
 Swensen's
 TCBY
 Tastee-Freez
 Ted Drewes
 Toscanini's
 Tropical Sno
 Twistee Treat
 United Dairy Farmers
 Vic's Ice Cream
 Wendy's Supa Sundaes
 Whitey's Ice Cream

Defunct
 Bresler's Ice Cream
 Farrell's Ice Cream Parlour
 Jahn's

See also

 List of casual dining restaurant chains
 List of desserts
 List of fast food restaurants
 List of frozen yogurt companies
 List of ice cream brands
 List of ice cream flavors
 Lists of restaurants

References

External links
 

Lists of companies by industry
Lists of restaurants